The Nakajima G8N Renzan (連山, "Mountain Range") was a four-engine long-range bomber designed for use by the Imperial Japanese Navy. The Navy designation was "Type 18 land-based attack aircraft" (十八試陸上攻撃機); the Allied code name was "Rita".

Design and development
In February 1943 the Imperial Navy staff asked Nakajima Aircraft Company to design a four-engined bomber, capable of meeting an earlier specification set for a long-range land-based attack plane. The final specification, issued on 14 September 1943, called for a plane with a maximum speed of  able to carry a  bomb-load  or a reduced bomb-load .

Nakajima's design featured a mid-mounted wing of small area and high aspect ratio, a tricycle landing gear and a large single-fin rudder. Power came from four 2,000 hp Nakajima NK9K-L "Homare" 24 radial engines with Hitachi 92 turbosuperchargers and driving four-bladed propellers. The engines were cooled by counter-rotating fans positioned just inside the engine cowlings. Defensive armament included power-operated nose, dorsal, ventral and tail turrets along with two free-swiveling machine guns at the beam positions.

Operational history

The initial prototype was completed in October 1944 and delivered to the Navy for testing in January 1945, a year after the Navy ordered development to start. Three further examples were completed by June 1945, with the third prototype being destroyed on the ground by US carrier aircraft.

Other than minor problems with the turbosuperchargers, the Renzan performed satisfactorily and the Navy hoped to have a total of 16 prototypes and 48 production-version G8N1s assembled by September 1945. But the worsening war situation and a critical shortage of light aluminium alloys led to the project's cancellation in June.

One proposed variant was the G8N2 Renzan-Kai Model 22, powered by four 2,200 hp Mitsubishi MK9A radial engines and modified to accept attachment of the air-launched Ohka Type 33 Special Attack Bomber.

Just before Japan's surrender in August 1945 consideration was also briefly given to producing an all-steel version of the aircraft, to be designated G8N3 Renzan-Kai Model 23, but the cessation of hostilities precluded any further development.

After the war, one prototype was taken to the United States and scrapped after testing. None are in existence today.

Variants
 G8N1 : Four-engine heavy bomber. Production version.
 G8N2 : Modified to carry Ohka Type 33 Special Attack Bomber. Four Mitsubishi MK9A radial engines.
 G8N3 : All-steel airframe.

Operators

 Imperial Japanese Navy Air Service

Specifications (G8N1)

See also

References

Notes

Bibliography

 Collier, Basil. Japanese Aircraft of World War II. New York: Mayflower Books, 1979. .
 
 
 Unknown authors. Famous Airplanes of the World: Nakajima Shinzan / Renzan (Volume 11, no.146). Japan: Bunrin-Do, Nov. 1984.

G08N
1940s Japanese bomber aircraft
Four-engined tractor aircraft
World War II Japanese heavy bombers
Aircraft first flown in 1944
Mid-wing aircraft
Four-engined piston aircraft